Claudia Sersun (born Slobozia-Duşca) is a politician and activist from Moldova. She served as the head of the Department of Culture of the Criuleni District, Ialoveni District, and Chişinău County. She has been a founder member of the Women's political club since December 16, 1999.

Awards 
 Claudia Sersun was awarded, by a presidential decree, with Romania's highest state decoration – the Order of the Star of Romania.

References

External links  
 Claudia Sersun

Moldovan musicians
Moldovan activists
Our Moldova Alliance politicians
Living people
Year of birth missing (living people)